Divitdar Mehmed Emin Pasha ("Mehmed Emin Pasha the Stenographer"; also known as Divitdar Emin Mehmed Pasha or Emin Mehmed Pasha or Muhammad Pasha Amin; died 1753) was an Ottoman statesman who served as grand vizier of the Ottoman Empire from 1750 to 1752. After this, he was exiled to Rethymno on Crete for three years.

After returning from exile, he served as the Ottoman governor of Egypt in 1753. He died either one day (May 1753) or two months (August 1753) in Cairo after taking office as governor of Egypt. He was buried near the shrine and tomb of Al-Shafi‘i.

See also
 List of Ottoman Grand Viziers
 List of Ottoman governors of Egypt

References

1753 deaths
18th-century Grand Viziers of the Ottoman Empire
18th-century Ottoman governors of Egypt
Ottoman governors of Egypt
Year of birth missing